Gita Persada Butterfly Park was founded in 1997 by Anshori Djausal and Herawati Soekardi in an effort to preserve and protect Sumatran butterfly species from extinction. Increasing environmental issues such as Deforestation in Indonesia prompted the founders to establish this park with the hope that it would serve as a model for butterfly conservation. The park located at the southern tip of Sumatra at the foot of Mount Betung about fifteen minutes from Bandar Lampung. The park currently houses over 100 species of Sumatran butterflies.

References

External links
 Sumatran Butterflies in Gita Persada Butterfly Park
 Sumatran Butterflies Photographs

Butterfly houses
Parks in Indonesia
Conservation projects
Articles needing infobox zoo